Hospital Halt railway station served Donegal in County Donegal, Ireland.

The station opened on 1 June 1935 on the Donegal Railway Company line from Donegal to Ballyshannon.

It closed on 15 December 1947.

Routes

References

Disused railway stations in County Donegal
Railway stations opened in 1935
Railway stations closed in 1947